Gregory A. Kasavin (born August 21, 1977) is an American writer and designer for Supergiant Games, and the former site director and executive editor at the gaming website GameSpot for over 10 years.

Early life and education
Kasavin attended University of California, Berkeley.

Career
Prior to working at GameSpot, he worked on Newtype Gaming Magazine. Kasavin also ran a small website called Arcadia Magazine, which reviewed video games and films, and eventually led to his internship at GameSpot. He joined GameSpot in November 1996. On January 3, 2007, GameSpot announced Kasavin's resignation from his position as editor-in-chief. Kasavin worked for Electronic Arts' Los Angeles Studio as associate producer for the PC version of Command & Conquer 3: Tiberium Wars and as a producer for Command & Conquer: Red Alert 3 and its expansion Uprising. While working for EA-LA he hosted a program called Command School, part of Command & Conquer TV, which helps players gain experience at C&C games. He later took a position at 2K Games working as a publishing producer on Spec Ops: The Line.

Kasavin is working at Supergiant Games, and was the writer and creative director of Bastion, Transistor, Pyre, and Hades.

References

External links
Interview with Kasavin
State of Play interview
Getting To Know GameSpot, Episode IX: Greg Kasavin

1977 births
Living people
American male journalists
CNET
Electronic Arts employees
Nebula Award winners
Russian emigrants to the United States
University of California, Berkeley alumni
Video game producers
Video game designers
Video game writers